The Minerva Creek Bridge is located in Liberty Township north of Clemons, Iowa, United States. The Marshall County Board of Supervisors awarded a $14,090 contract to the N.M. Stark and Company of Des Moines to build six concrete bridges. They were all designed by W.W. Morehouse, the Marshall County Engineer. This single-span concrete Luten arch bridge was completed the same year for $2,550. It was the longest of the six bridges in the contract. The bridge was listed on the National Register of Historic Places in 1998.

References

Bridges completed in 1910
Bridges in Marshall County, Iowa
Road bridges on the National Register of Historic Places in Iowa
National Register of Historic Places in Marshall County, Iowa
Arch bridges in Iowa
Concrete bridges in the United States